Thomas John Heron (14 August 1879 – 30 October 1928) was an Australian trade unionist and politician who was a Labor Party member of the Legislative Assembly of Western Australia from 1920 until his death, representing the seat of Mount Leonora.

Heron was born in Eldorado, Victoria, to Isabella Ann (née Gilbertson) and Thomas Heron. He came to Western Australia in 1901, working as a miner on the Eastern Goldfields. He lived for periods in Menzies and Kookynie, and eventually became president of the Gwalia branch of the Miners' Union. Heron entered parliament at the 1920 Mount Leonora by-election, caused by the resignation of George Foley. He was re-elected on another three occasions at state elections. Heron collapsed and died in the reading room at Parliament House in October 1928, aged 49. He had married Wilhelmina Ahrens in 1902, with whom he had three children.

References

1879 births
1928 deaths
Australian Labor Party members of the Parliament of Western Australia
Australian trade unionists
Members of the Western Australian Legislative Assembly
People from Victoria (Australia)